The European University Cyprus (EUC) is a private university in Nicosia, Cyprus which evolved out of Cyprus College, the oldest institution of higher education in Cyprus. EUC has a selective admission policy based on students' past academic record and performance. The institution has a current enrollment of more than 8,500 students and provides internationally recognized undergraduate, graduate and doctorate degrees. The programs of study are graded based on the European Credit Transfer and Accumulation System (ECTS).

History
Ioannis Gregoriou in 1961 founded the first Business College in Cyprus under the brand name "Cyprus College". The college later developed into the current European University Cyprus in 2007, following a change in the law to allow the operation of private universities in Cyprus. All bachelor's, master's and Ph.D. programs have been approved by The Cyprus Agency of Quality Assurance and Accreditation in Higher Education (CYQAA) and are recognized worldwide. European University Cyprus cooperates with several universities all over the world. It participates in Erasmus+ program and enables students, academics and staff to travel and study at several universities in Europe and beyond. President Bill Clinton, Honorary Chancellor of Laureate International Universities, visited EUC in 2012. The president advised on Social Responsibility, youth leadership and increasing access to higher education.

European University Cyprus is part of Galileo Global Education, Europe’s largest higher education group with a network of 54 institutions present in over 80 campuses in 13 countries and over 170,000 enrolled students.

Schools and departments
EUC is composed of six schools:

School of Humanities, Social and Education Sciences
 Department of Arts
 Department of Education Sciences
 Department of Humanities
 Department of Social and Behavioral Sciences

School of Sciences
 Department of Computer Science and Engineering
 Department of Health Sciences
 Department of Life Sciences

School of Business Administration
 Department of Accounting, Economics and Finance
 Department of Management and Marketing

School of Medicine
Students are taught and trained in Cyprus. No ‘premedical’ coursework is required as the program of study provides an all-inclusive, full basic sciences thematic unit. The European University Cyprus School of Medicine is accredited by the Cyprus Agency of Quality Assurance and Accreditation in Higher Education (DI.PA.E) and the World Federation for Medical Education (WFME), approved by Hellenic National Academic Recognition Information Centre and listed in the International Medical Education Directory of the Foundation for Advancement of International Medical Education and Research. Nobel Laureates, Biochemist Tomas Lindahl (Chemistry 2015) and Biochemist Robert Huber (Chemistry 1988) are among the Professors of the School of Medicine. Nobel Laureate (Chemistry 2009), Biochemist Ada Yonath and Biochemist Jean-Marie Lehn (Chemistry 1987), are Honorary professors of the School. In 2017, the School offered the first Dental degree Program in Cyprus. The School of Medicine is now officially recognised by the European Parliament and Council on the IMI (Internal Market Information System) platform. It counts students from numerous countries such as Austria, France, Germany, Greece, Belgium, Israel, Italy, Sweden, Russia, the UAE, the UK and the US as well as many students from Cyprus.

Medicine Frankfurt Branch
Beginning operation in September 2022, the European University Cyprus School of Medicine’s
Frankfurt Branch offers the MD Degree in Germany. The Medical Doctor program is conducted
in English, and carries a minimum workload of 5500 hours of theoretical and practical training,
equivalent to 360 ECTS, and it can be completed over six years.

School of Dentistry
The School of Dentistry offers a five-year Dental Surgery DBS Degree, conducted in English.

Dental Clinic on Campus
The dental clinic operates on EUC campus and is used for the training of dental students.

School of Law
The School of Law of European University Cyprus  is the first autonomous School of Law in Cyprus, by the Law Council of the Republic of Cyprus. This enables graduates to register at the Cyprus bar Association.

Distance Learning Unit
The Distance Learning Unit  was established in 2013. 

In collaboration with the university's schools, the Distance Education Unit offers bachelor's and master's degrees, in various disciplines, such as education, music education, psychology, public health, public administration, counselling, business administration, marketing communication and social media, information systems, English language and literature, cybersecurity, artificial intelligence and speech pathology. These programs are offered in Greek and/or English.

References

Educational institutions established in 1961
For-profit universities and colleges in Europe
European University Cyprus
Education in Nicosia
1961 establishments in Cyprus